Budd Schulberg (born  Seymour Wilson Schulberg, March 27, 1914 – August 5, 2009) was an American screenwriter, television producer, novelist and sports writer. He was known for his novels What Makes Sammy Run? and The Harder They Fall; his Academy Award-winning screenplay for On the Waterfront, and his screenplay for A Face in the Crowd.

Early life and education
Schulberg was raised in a Jewish family the son of Hollywood film-producer B. P. Schulberg and Adeline (née Jaffe) Schulberg, who founded a talent agency taken over by her brother, agent/film producer Sam Jaffe. In 1931, when Schulberg was 17, his father left the family to live with actress Sylvia Sidney. His parents divorced in 1933.

Schulberg attended Deerfield Academy and then went on to Dartmouth College, where he was actively involved in the Dartmouth Jack-O-Lantern humor magazine and was a member of the Pi Lambda Phi fraternity. In 1939, he collaborated on the screenplay for Winter Carnival, a light comedy set at Dartmouth. One of his collaborators was F. Scott Fitzgerald, who was fired because of his alcoholic binge during a visit with Schulberg to Dartmouth. Dartmouth College awarded Schulberg an honorary degree in 1960.

World War II
While serving in the Navy during World War II, Schulberg was assigned to the Office of Strategic Services (OSS), working with John Ford's documentary unit. Following VE Day, he reportedly witnessed the liberation of Nazi concentration camps. He was involved in gathering evidence against war criminals for the Nuremberg Trials, an assignment that included arresting propaganda film maker Leni Riefenstahl at her chalet in Kitzbühel, Austria, ostensibly to have her identify the faces of Nazi war criminals in German film footage captured by the Allied troops. Riefenstahl claimed she was not aware of the nature of the concentration camps. According to Schulberg, "She gave me the usual song and dance. She said: 'Of course, you know, I'm really so misunderstood. I'm not political.'"

Career
Being the son of a successful Hollywood producer gave Schulberg an insider's viewpoint on the true happenings of Hollywood, which was reflected in much of his writing.

His 1941 novel What Makes Sammy Run? allowed the public to see the harshness of Hollywood stardom via Sammy Glick's rise to power in a major Hollywood film studio. This novel was criticized by some as being self-directed anti-semitism. Then a member of the Communist Party USA, Schulberg quit in protest after he was ordered by high-ranking Party member John Howard Lawson to make changes to the novel.

In 1950, Schulberg published The Disenchanted, about a young screenwriter who collaborates on a screenplay about a college winter festival with a famous novelist at the nadir of his career. The novelist (who was then assumed by reviewers to be a thinly disguised portrait of Fitzgerald, who had died 10 years earlier) is portrayed as a tragic, flawed figure, with whom the young screenwriter becomes disillusioned. The novel was the tenth bestselling novel in the United States in 1950 and was adapted as a Broadway play in 1958, starring Jason Robards (who won a Tony Award for his performance) and George Grizzard as the character loosely based on Schulberg. In 1958, Schulberg wrote and co-produced (with his younger brother Stuart) the film Wind Across the Everglades, directed by Nicholas Ray.

Schulberg wrote the 1957 film A Face in the Crowd. Based on the short story "Your Arkansas Traveler" in his book Some Faces in the Crowd, the film starred newcomer Andy Griffith as an obscure country singer who rises to fame and becomes extraordinarily manipulative to preserve his success and power.

Schulberg encountered political controversy in 1951 when screenwriter Richard Collins, testifying to the House Un-American Activities Committee (HUAC), named Schulberg as a former member of the Communist Party. Schulberg, still resentful of the influence Communist officials tried to exert over his fiction, testified as a friendly witness and explained how Communist Party members had sought to influence the content of What Makes Sammy Run? and "named names" of other Hollywood communists.

Schulberg was also a sports writer and former chief boxing correspondent for Sports Illustrated. He wrote some well-received books on boxing, including Sparring with Hemingway. He was inducted into the International Boxing Hall of Fame in 2002 in recognition of his contributions to the sport. 

In 1965, after a devastating riot had ripped apart the fabric of the Watts section of Los Angeles, Schulberg formed the Watts Writers Workshop in an attempt to ease frustrations and bring artistic training to the economically impoverished district. 

In 1982, Schulberg wrote Moving Pictures: Memoirs of a Hollywood Prince, an autobiography covering his youth in Hollywood growing up in the 1920s and 1930s among the famous motion picture actors and producers as the son of B. P. Schulberg, head of Paramount Studios.

Personal life and death

Schulberg was married four times. In 1936, he married his first wife, actress Virginia "Jigee" Lee Ray. They had one daughter, Victoria, before divorcing in 1942. In 1943, he married Victoria "Vickee" Anderson. They divorced in 1964. They had two children: Stephen (born 1944) and David (born 1946). David was a Vietnam veteran who predeceased his father. In 1964, he married actress Geraldine Brooks. They were married until her death in 1977; they had no children. In 1977, he married Betsy Ann Langman, stepdaughter of real estate developer Robert E. Simon, granddaughter of investment banker Maurice Wertheim and great-granddaughter of US ambassador Henry Morgenthau Sr.; they had two children: Benn and Jessica.

His niece Sandra Schulberg was an executive producer of the Academy Award-nominated film Quills. His mother, of the Ad Schulberg Agency, served as his agent until her death in 1977. His brother, Stuart Schulberg, was a movie and television producer (David Brinkley's Journal, The Today Show).  His sister, Sonya Schulberg (O'Sullivan) (1918–2016), was an occasional writer (of a novel, They Cried a Little, and stories).

Budd Schulberg died on August 5, 2009, in his home in Quiogue, New York, aged 95.

Bibliography

 What Makes Sammy Run? (1941)
 The Harder They Fall (1947)
 The Disenchanted (1950)
 Some Faces in the Crowd (1952)
 
 On the Waterfront (1954)
 Moving Pictures: Memoirs of a Hollywood Prince (1982)
 Sparring with Hemingway (1995)

Select film and TV credits
A Star Is Born (1937) - uncredited writer
Nothing Sacred (1937) - uncredited writer
On the Waterfront (1954) - story, script
The Harder They Fall (1956) - based on his novel
A Face in the Crowd (1957) - story, script
Wind Across the Everglades (1958) - script, producer, uncredited director

See also

 The Nazi Plan

References

Further reading
Beck, Nicholas. Budd Schulberg: A Bio-Bibliography Lanham, Md.: Scarecrow Press, 2001.

External links

The Papers of Budd Schulberg in Rauner Special Collections Library, Dartmouth College

Channel 4 News interview with Budd Schulberg, February 2009
1998 interview with Schulberg about On the Waterfront
"The Priest Who Made Budd Schulberg Run: 'On the Waterfront' and Jesuit Social Action", Inside Fordham Online, May 2003
"Corruption Found at Waterfront Watchdog" The New York Times, August 12, 2009.  Article mentions Schulberg and his book On the Waterfront in noting similarity to recent allegations.

1914 births
2009 deaths
20th-century American Jews
20th-century American male writers
20th-century American novelists
20th-century American screenwriters
21st-century American Jews
American male novelists
American male screenwriters
Best Original Screenplay Academy Award winners
Dartmouth College alumni
Deerfield Academy alumni
Esquire (magazine) people
Jaffe family
Jewish American novelists
Jewish American screenwriters
Jewish American television producers
Morgenthau family
Novelists from New York (state)
People from Long Island
People of the Office of Strategic Services
Screenwriters from New York (state)
Television producers from New York City
United States Navy personnel of World War II
Writers from New York City